The Kids Choice Awards Argentina 2013 were delivered on 18 October 2013 in Microestadio Malvinas Argentinas, Buenos Aires. On 23 July 2013 is unveiled the first stage, presenting a list of 17 categories with their pre-nominees.

6 September 2013 is unveiled the second stage, announcing the nominees' officials. The event was hosted by the Argentine actor Diego Ramos. The event was featured with live performances of Lali Espósito, Tan Bionica, Airbag and Aliados.

Winners and nominees 
List of nominees and winners:.

Categories

Favourite TV Show

Favourite TV Actor

Favourite TV Actress

Favourite Actor of Cast

Favourite Villain

Revelation

International TV Show

Favourite Animated Series

Artist or Favourite Latin Group

Favourite Latin Song

Favourite Radio Program

Favourite International Song

Best Animated Film

Film Favourite in Cinemas

Deportist of the Year

Best Celebrity on Twitter

Favourite Application

References 

Kids' Choice Awards
Nickelodeon Kids' Choice Awards